Spotlight Group Holdings Pty Ltd (SGH) is an Australian retail conglomerate and one of the country's largest private companies. Its Spotlight Retail Group (SRG) division operates fabric and craft store chain Spotlight, outdoor retailers Anaconda and Mountain Designs, and department store chain Harris Scarfe. The first Spotlight store was established in Melbourne in 1973 by brothers Morry Fraid and Ruben Fried.

History
Spotlight was established by brothers Morry Fraid and Ruben Fried, whose names were spelled differently due to a mistake by their teachers. They immigrated to Australia from Israel in 1956 with their parents, who established a fabric stall at the Queen Victoria Market in Melbourne. The first Spotlight store was opened in 1973 in Malvern. By 1990 there were 30 stores across Australia and the company was turning over about 90 million, with the brothers' net worth estimated by the Australian Financial Review as about 30 million.

Beginning in the late 1990s, Spotlight used economic value added as an internal metric to calculate employee bonuses. By 2006, Spotlight was employing 6,000 people and had a turnover of 600 million. It used the Howard Government's WorkChoices legislation to entice its employees to accept Australian workplace agreements with lower wage rates.

In 2017, Spotlight was reportedly Australia's fifth-largest privately owned retailer, behind 7-Eleven, the Peregrine Corporation, Cotton On Group, and Peter Warren Automotive.

Expansion
Outside of Australia, Spotlight has stores in Singapore (1995), New Zealand (1996), and Malaysia (2014). 

In March 2018, Spotlight Group announced that it had acquired outdoor retailer Mountain Designs for an undisclosed sum.

In March 2020, Spotlight Group was awarded the exclusive right to bid for Harris Scarfe, a chain of department stores placed into voluntary administration in 2019. The sale proceeded for a reported $70 million. In March 2021, Zac Fried announced that Spotlight Group planned to open 50 new Harris Scarfe stores in order to compete against Big W and Kmart.

Net worth 
In 2021, The Australian listed Morry Fraid and Zac Fried, a son of Reuben Fried, as the 30th and 31st richest people in Australia, with a net worth of 2.81 billion each. Meanwhile and in a contrasting assessment one month later, Morry Fraid, Zac Fried and family were listed on the Financial Review 2021 Rich List with a collective/joint net worth of 3.19 billion.

Structure
 Spotlight Group Holdings is divided into the Spotlight Property Group (SPG), managing the group's property portfolio; the Alara Investment Group, managing other investments; and the Spotlight Retail Group (SRG), which is divided into the brands of Spotlight, Anaconda, Mountain Designs, and Harris Scarfe.

References

External links
 

Homeware retailers of New Zealand
Homeware retailers of Australia
Family-owned companies of Australia
Australian companies established in 1973
Holding companies of Australia